Klara Post (born 5 July 1926) was a Dutch gymnast. She competed in the women's artistic team all-around event at the 1948 Summer Olympics.

References

External links
 

1926 births
Living people
Dutch female artistic gymnasts
Olympic gymnasts of the Netherlands
Gymnasts at the 1948 Summer Olympics
Sportspeople from Arnhem